The Erzyas or Erzya people (Erźat) are one of the Mordvin peoples.

Famous people of Erzya descent

 Purgaz
 Stepan Erzia, Russian sculptor
 Nadezhda Kadysheva, Russian singer
 Vasily Chapayev, Bolshevik commander
 Valeri Vasioukhin, Professor of Cancer Biology, University of Washington

See also
 Ryazan Principality

References

 
Volga Finns
Finnic peoples
Paganism in Europe
Lutheranism in Russia
Indigenous peoples of Europe
Ethnic groups in Russia